Luka Milovanov Georgijević (Osat, Bosnia-Hercegovina, now Republika Srpska, 1784 – Osat, Bosnia-Herzegovina, 1828) was a Serbian writer and philologist. In literature, he is considered the first children's poet of modern Serbian literature. He advised Vuk Karadžić on the production of grammars and the dictionary.

Biography
He was born in Bosnia, near Srebrenica, in the region of Osat in 1784. Two years after the birth of Luka, his father Milovan moved with his family to Srem, where he settled first in Čerević and then in Vinkovci. There Luka went to grammar school, in Szeged he studied philosophy, and in Pest he completed his law studies and became a jurist. We know that in 1810 when he wrote his important work, he was a teacher at a Serbian national school in the city of Pest where he taught Sava Mrkalj. At one time, he suffered an ill-fated misfortune. This Budapest teacher unexpectedly turned deaf after being in a blizzard in Russia.

Although hindered by unfortunate circumstances, Luka Milovanov who removed some superfluous letters in his works may be considered among the first reformers (alongside Venclović, Dositej, and Mrkalj) of the Serbian alphabet.

In the winter of 1811, Luka paid a last visit to Imperial Russia in Irmu, where he taught a group of choral singers mathematics, being out that night in the cold he came home and suddenly discovered that he could no longer hear. As time went on he not only lost his capacity to earn a living by giving lessons but there was also a price on his mental health. In time, his alternating moods of exuberance and despair became more extreme; especially the periods of despair were longer and deeper. His outward appearance became more unkempt. His fits of despair sometimes left him moping in silence, but at other times they led to heavy drinking. It was an understandable cause, all connected with that hearing loss in Russia.

In Buda, Luka met Vuk Karadžić in 1814, and Vuk sought to have Luka rearrange his manuscript, which Luka kept in very poor condition. Always in financial distress, Luka would take any type of writing job he could find, preparing writs and abstracts for paralegals and lawyers, and translating books first for Gligorije Dimić, a wealthy merchant, and later for Orthodox Bishop Dionisije Popović to survive. Finally weakened and physically ill, he began to lose his sight as well and died in a terrible slum on 23 November 1828. There were three Serbian women who were taking turns to care for him in his last days, Luka Milovanov handed over to one of them his manuscript telling her to give it to Vuk Karadžić. That woman turned out to be the future wife of Sima Milutinović, Marija Popović-Punkatorka. Vuk described Luka as "a man of medium height, very humorous, and honest to a fault." At one time Luka was invited to emigrate to Imperial Russia, but he preferred to move to Serbia, yet he did not go to either country.

His contemporaries were poets and writers Lukijan Mušicki, Ivan Jugović, Sima Milutinović Sarajlija, Jeremija Gagić, Sava Mrkalj, Stevan Živković-Telemak, Pavle Solarić, and philologists Jernej Kopitar, Josef Dobrovský, Nicholas Révai (1750–1807), and Johann Christoph Adelung. Georgijević gave his support to Vuk and Kopitar long before the Serbian Language Controversy. Both Luka Milovanov and his pupil Sava Mrkalj shared the same vision about the language reform.

Philological and literary work
Luka Milovanov Georgijević composed his Opit nastavlenija k srbskoj sličnorečnosti i slogomerija ili prosidiji, but he came into sharp conflict with a censor and the church hierarchy and did not succeed in having his work printed during his lifetime. Vuk Karadžić considered Luka Milovanov to be, one of his teachers, he esteemed his work and published his manuscripts in a book only after Milovanov's death.

Luka Milovanov Georgijević, the Bosnian refugee-emigrant, a student of law and later a teacher in Pest consecrated a study to Serbian prosody in Pest in 1810; it is particularly important that he wrote it in the people's idiom, in a standard language, and for that purpose, he established the modern Serbian Cyrillic orthography adopted and propagated by Vuk Karadžić, the reformer of the modern Serbian (and Croatian) literary language. Unfortunately, the publication of Luka Milovanov Georgijević's work was held up by censors, and his study "The Serbian Word – Assonance and Syllabic Measure or the Trial Attempt for the Recital of Poetry" (Opit nastavlenia k srbskoj sličnorečnosti i slogomerija ili prosodiji) was published by the printing press of the Armenian monastery in Vienna in 1833, some five years posthumously.

In Serbian literature Luka Milovanov Georgiević is the forerunner of modern Serbian Cyrillic, in which Johann Christoph Adelung's rule is respected at the end: "write as you say". Luka Milovanov was the first aesthetic master for making verses. In Serbian literature, he occupies the position of the first children's poet. His original songs "On the New Year's Booklet" and "My Children on the Majals", written in 1810, marks the birth of modern Serbian literature for children. The theme of the first is the father's joy of donating to the little ones the best present for the New Year: a book like a hot new knowledge and gaming spirit. The poem radiates parental love and the desire to see the little ones with a reward. The other is a sign of love towards childhood as the beauty of life. The verse is simple, naive, free and adaptable. Lack of lexical and metaphors compensates for the lightness of expression and rhythm. By choosing the theme, the process, the feeling for verse, and rhythm, his style does not significantly differ from today's literature. After all, Luka Milovanov followed the rules of classical prosody in his versification.

Serbian literacy
The origins of literacy in Serbia, however, reach far in the past. An ancient script – Vinča symbols—dating back to the year 5,500 BC was discovered at the Vinča culture archaeological site near Belgrade by Miloje Vasić in 1908. Recently, the similarity between 22 letters from the Vinča script and the Serbian Cyrillic script was established, leading the scientists to conclude that other nations came into contact with the Vinča script and adopted some signs.

Modern Serbian Cyrillic script, originating from the old Glagolitic alphabet, is characterized by the fact that one letter represents one sound. This unique rule was introduced by Vuk Stefanović Karadžić (also based on Johann Christoph Adelung's rule) in his 19th-century grand reform of Serbian language and script. The rule is nowadays used in several languages of South Slavic nations.

References 

Serbian writers
1784 births
1828 deaths
Writers from the Ottoman Empire